N,N-Dimethyl-1-naphthylamine is an aromatic amine. It is formally derived from 1-naphthylamine by replacing the hydrogen atoms on the amino group with methyl groups. N,N-Dimethyl-1-naphthylamine is used in the nitrate reductase test to form a red precipitate of Prontosil by reacting with a nitrite-sulfanilic acid complex.

References

1-Naphthyl compounds
Dimethylamino compounds